William Windsor may refer to:

William, Prince of Wales (born 1982), elder son of King Charles III and Diana, Princess of Wales
William de Windsor (–1384), English feudal lord
William Windsor, 2nd Baron Windsor (1498–1558), MP for Chipping Wycombe in 1529
Bobby Windsor (born 1948), British rugby union footballer
William Windsor (goat), known as "Billy", a military mascot goat

See also 
Baron Windsor